Olivia Shae Sanabia (born April 13, 2003) is an American singer, songwriter, multi-instrumentalist, and actress. She is best known for her roles as Kelly Quinn in Just Add Magic and Charlotte Wrather in Coop & Cami Ask the World.

Early life
Sanabia was born on April 13, 2003, in Corona, California. Sanabia was first introduced to acting in musical theater at six years of age.

Career
Sanabia started her career as a model and actress, appearing in several commercials. She continued to appear in small roles on shows, before landing the lead role on the Amazon Prime show Just Add Magic as Kelly Quinn from 2016 to 2019, and its spin-off Just Add Magic: Mystery City during 2020. From 2018 to 2020, she starred in the Disney Channel show Coop & Cami Ask the World as Charlotte Wrather.

Sanabia is also a singer. She released her first single "Stars Crossed" in 2019, and in 2020, she recorded and released a single called "The Train". In November 2021, Sanabia wrote and released her first original Christmas single called "Evergreen".

Filmography

Discography
Singles

Awards and nominations

References

External links
 

2003 births
Living people
People from Corona, California
Child pop musicians
American child actresses
American women pop singers
American women singer-songwriters
American child singers
American film actresses
American television actresses
Actresses from California
21st-century American women
Singer-songwriters from California